The blossom-headed parakeet (Psittacula roseata) is a parrot in the family Psittaculidae.

Taxonomy
The species is divided into two subspecies:
Psittacula roseata juneae Biswas, 1951 (S Myanmar and Thailand to Laos, Cambodia and Vietnam)
Psittacula roseata roseata Biswas, 1951 (N India to Bhutan, Bangladesh and N Myanmar)

Distribution and habitat

This species is a resident breeder in Eastern Bangladesh, Bhutan, Northeast India and Nepal, eastwards into South-east Asia (Cambodia, Laos, Myanmar, Thailand and Viet Nam) and also China. Blossom-headed parakeet inhabits lowland and foothill open forests and forest edges.

Description

Psittacula roseata  is a lime-green parrot, 30 cm long with a tail up to 18 cm. The male's head is pink becoming pale blue on the back of the crown, nape and cheeks. There is a narrow black neck collar and a black chin stripe. There is a red shoulder patch and the rump and tail are bluish-green, the latter tipped yellow. The upper mandible is yellow, and the lower mandible is dark. The female has a pale grey head and lacks the black neck collar and chin stripe patch. The lower mandible is pale. Immature birds have a green head and a grey chin.  Both mandibles are yellowish and there is no red shoulder patch. The different head colour and the yellow tip to the tail distinguish this species from the similar plum-headed parakeet (Psittacula cyanocephala).

Biology
Blossom-headed parakeet nests in holes in trees, laying 4-5 white eggs. It undergoes local movements, driven mainly by the availability of the fruit and blossoms which make up its diet. It is a gregarious and noisy species with range of raucous calls.

Bibliography
Grimmett, Inskipp y Inskipp, Birds of India ISBN 0-691-04910-6
Josep del Hoyo, Andrew Elliott, Jordi Sargatal (Hrsg.): Handbook of the Birds of the World. Volume 4: Sandgrouse to Cuckoos. Lynx Edicions, Barcelona, 1997. ISBN 8487334229
Joseph Michael Forshaw: Parrots of the World - An Identification Guide. Princeton University Press, Princeton 2006, ISBN 978-0-691-09251-5.

External links
 Ouseaux 
 Tutto pappagalli

References 
 Birds of India by Grimmett, Inskipp and Inskipp, 

blossom-headed parakeet
Parrots of Asia
Birds of Northeast India
Birds of Southeast Asia
blossom-headed parakeet
blossom-headed parakeet
Taxobox binomials not recognized by IUCN